The 2005 Pacific hurricane season was the least active season since the 2001 season, producing 16 tropical depressions; 15 of which became tropical storms or hurricanes. The season officially started on May 15, 2005 in the eastern Pacific, designated as the area east of 140°W, and on June 1, 2005 in the central Pacific, which is between the International Date Line and 140°W, and lasted until November 30, 2005. These dates typically limit the period of each year when most tropical cyclones form in the eastern Pacific basin. This timeline documents all the storm formations, strengthening, weakening, landfalls, extratropical transitions, as well as dissipation. The timeline also includes information which was not operationally released, meaning that information from post-storm reviews by the National Hurricane Center, such as information on a storm that was not operationally warned on, has been included.

The first storm of the season, Hurricane Adrian, formed off the southwest coast of El Salvador and made the closest approach of any hurricane to the country on record. Most of June was quiet until the end of the month, when two tropical storms developed. July remained inactive as well, as only two tropical storms formed. In August, the activity picked up somewhat; the Central Pacific had its first and only depression of the year and four tropical storms, two of which became hurricanes, forming in the Eastern Pacific. September was the most active month of the year; six tropical storms formed, four of which became hurricanes, and two of the hurricanes strengthened further to become the only major hurricanes of the year. The strongest storm of the season was Hurricane Kenneth, whose remnants briefly threatened Hawaii near the end of the month. Activity sharply dropped off in October as only one tropical depression formed. No storms formed in November in both basins, and the season ended on November 30.

Timeline of storms

May
May 15

The Eastern Pacific hurricane season officially begins.

May 17
11:00 a.m. PDT (18:00 UTC) – Tropical Depression One-E forms 460 miles (740 km) west-southwest of El Salvador.
5:00 p.m. PDT (00:00 UTC May 18) – Tropical Depression One-E strengthens into Tropical Storm Adrian.

May 19
11:00 a.m. PDT (18:00 UTC) – Tropical Storm Adrian strengthens into Hurricane Adrian.
5:00 p.m. PDT (00:00 UTC May 20) – Hurricane Adrian weakens to a tropical storm.

May 20
11:00 a.m. PDT (18:00 UTC) – Tropical Storm Adrian weakens to a tropical depression.
2:00 p.m. PDT (21:00 UTC – Tropical Depression Adrian makes landfall on the Pacific coast of Honduras in the Gulf of Fonseca with winds of 25 mph (35 km/h).
11:00 p.m. PDT (06:00 UTC May 21) – Tropical Depression Adrian dissipates.

June
June 1
The Central Pacific hurricane season officially begins.

June 21

11:00 a.m. PDT (18:00 UTC) – Tropical Depression Two-E forms 385 mi (620 km) south of Zihuatanejo, Mexico.

June 22
5:00 a.m. PDT (12:00 UTC) – Tropical Depression Two-E strengthens into Tropical Storm Beatriz.

June 23
5:00 p.m. PDT (00:00 UTC June 24) – Tropical Storm Beatriz weakens to a tropical depression.
11:00 p.m. PDT (06:00 UTC June 24) – Tropical Depression Beatriz degenerates into a remnant low-pressure area.

June 25
11:00 p.m. PDT (06:00 UTC June 26) –  Tropical Depression Three-E forms 330 mi (530 km) south-southeast of Acapulco, Mexico.

June 26
5:00 a.m. PDT (12:00 UTC) – The remnants of Beatriz dissipate.
11:00 a.m. PDT (18:00 UTC) – Tropical Depression Three-E strengthens into Tropical Storm Calvin.

June 28
5:00 a.m. PDT (12:00 UTC) – Tropical Storm Calvin weakens to a tropical depression.
11:00 p.m. PDT (06:00 UTC June 29) – Tropical Depression Calvin degenerates into a remnant low-pressure area.

July
July 3

5:00 a.m. PDT (12:00 UTC) – The remnants of Calvin dissipate.
5:00 p.m. PDT (00:00 UTC July 4) – Tropical Depression Four-E forms 145 mi (235 km) south of Acapulco, Mexico.
11:00 p.m. PDT (06:00 UTC July 4) – Tropical Depression Four-E strengthens into Tropical Storm Dora.

July 5
11:00 a.m. PDT (18:00 UTC) – Tropical Storm Dora weakens to a tropical depression.

July 6
5:00 a.m. PDT (12:00 UTC) – Tropical Depression Dora degenerates into a remnant low.
5:00 p.m. PDT (00:00 UTC July 7) – The remnants of Dora dissipate.

July 17
11:00 p.m. PDT (06:00 UTC July 18) – Tropical Depression Five-E forms 305 mi (490 km) south of Manzanillo, Mexico.

July 18
5:00 a.m. PDT (12:00 UTC) – Tropical Depression Five-E strengthens into Tropical Storm Eugene.

July 20
5:00 a.m. PDT (12:00 UTC) – Tropical Storm Eugene weakens to a tropical depression.
5:00 p.m. PDT (00:00 UTC July 21) – Tropical Depression Eugene degenerates into a remnant low-pressure area.

July 21
11:00 a.m. PDT (18:00 UTC) – The remnants of Eugene dissipate.

August
August 3

8:00 a.m. HST (18:00 UTC) – Tropical Depression One-C forms 1,000 mi (1,610 km) southeast of the Island of Hawaii.

August 4
8:00 p.m. HST (06:00 UTC August 5) – Tropical Depression One-C dissipates.

August 9
5:00 a.m. PDT (12:00 UTC) – Tropical Depression Six-E forms 945 mi (1,520 km) west-southwest of Acapulco, Mexico.
5:00 p.m. PDT (00:00 UTC August 10) – Tropical Depression Six-E strengthens into Tropical Storm Fernanda.

August 10
11:00 p.m. PDT (06:00 UTC August 11) – Tropical Storm Fernanda strengthens into a hurricane.
11:00 p.m. PDT (06:00 UTC August 11) – Tropical Depression Seven-E forms 690 mi (1,110 km) south of Cabo San Lucas, Mexico.

August 11
5:00 a.m. PDT (12:00 UTC) – Tropical Depression Seven-E strengthens into Tropical Storm Greg.

August 13
11:00 p.m. PDT (06:00 UTC August 14) – Hurricane Fernanda weakens to a tropical storm.

August 14

11:00 a.m. PDT (18:00 UTC) – Tropical Storm Greg weakens to a tropical depression.

August 15
11:00 a.m. PDT (18:00 UTC) – Tropical Storm Fernanda weakens to a tropical depression.
5:00 p.m. PDT (00:00 UTC August 16) – Tropical Depression Greg degenerates into a remnant low-pressure area.
11:00 p.m. PDT (06:00 UTC August 16) – Tropical Depression Fernanda degenerates into a remnant low-pressure area.

August 17
11:00 a.m. PDT (18:00 UTC) – The remnants of Fernanda dissipate.
11:00 a.m. PDT (18:00 UTC) – The remnants of Greg are absorbed into the Intertropical Convergence Zone.

August 19
11:00 a.m. PDT (18:00 UTC) – Tropical Depression Eight-E forms 160 mi (260 km) south of Puerto Angel, Mexico.
11:00 p.m. PDT (06:00 UTC August 20) – Tropical Depression Eight-E strengthens into Tropical Storm Hilary.

August 20
5:00 p.m. PDT (00:00 UTC August 21) – Tropical Storm Hilary strengthens into Hurricane Hilary.

August 21
5:00 p.m. PDT (00:00 UTC August 22) – Hurricane Hilary reaches category two intensity.

August 22

5:00 p.m. PDT (00:00 UTC August 23) – Hurricane Hilary weakens to a category one hurricane.

August 24
11:00 a.m. PDT (18:00 UTC) – Hurricane Hilary weakens to a tropical storm.

August 25
5:00 a.m. PDT (12:00 UTC) – Tropical Depression Nine-E forms 155 mi (250 km) south of Manzanillo, Mexico.
5:00 p.m. PDT (00:00 UTC August 26) – Tropical Depression Nine-E strengthens into Tropical Storm Irwin.

August 26
11:00 a.m. PDT (18:00 UTC) – Tropical Storm Hilary weakens to a tropical depression.
5:00 p.m. PDT (00:00 UTC August 27) – Tropical Depression Hilary degenerates into a remnant low-pressure area.

August 27
5:00 p.m. PDT (00:00 UTC August 28) – Tropical Storm Irwin weakens to a tropical depression.
11:00 p.m. PDT (06:00 UTC August 28) – The remnants of Hilary dissipate.

August 28
11:00 a.m. PDT (18:00 UTC) – Tropical Depression Irwin degenerates into a remnant low-pressure area.

September
September 2
5:00 p.m. PDT (00:00 UTC September 3) – The remnants of Irwin dissipate.

September 11

5:00 p.m. PDT (00:00 UTC September 12) – Tropical Depression Ten-E forms 630 mi (1,015 km) south-southwest of the southern tip of Baja California Sur.

September 14
11:00 a.m. PDT (12:00 UTC) – Tropical Depression Eleven-E forms 900 mi (1,450 km) southwest of Cabo San Lucas, Mexico.
5:00 p.m. PDT (00:00 UTC September 15) – Tropical Depression Ten-E strengthens into Tropical Storm Jova.
11:00 p.m. PDT (06:00 UTC September 15) – Tropical Depression Eleven-E strengthens into Tropical Storm Kenneth.

September 15
5:00 p.m. PDT (00:00 UTC September 16) – Tropical Storm Kenneth strengthens into Hurricane Kenneth.
11:00 p.m. PDT (06:00 UTC September 16) – Tropical Storm Jova strengthens into Hurricane Jova.

September 16
5:00 p.m. PDT (00:00 UTC September 17) – Hurricane Kenneth reaches category two intensity.
11:00 p.m. PDT (06:00 UTC September 17) – Hurricane Jova reaches category two intensity.
11:00 p.m PDT (06:00 UTC September 17) – Hurricane Kenneth reaches category three intensity, becoming the first major hurricane of the season.

September 17
5:00 a.m. PDT (12:00 UTC) – Tropical Depression Twelve-E forms 760 mi (1,225 km) southwest of the southern tip of Baja California Sur.
11:00 p.m. PDT (18:00 UTC) – Tropical Depression Twelve-E strengthens into Tropical Storm Lida.

September 18

Approximately 2:00 a.m. HST (12:00 UTC) –  Hurricane Jova, while a category two storm, crosses the 140°W boundary and moves into the Central Pacific Hurricane Center's area of responsibility.
5:00 a.m. PDT (12:00 UTC) – Hurricane Kenneth reaches category four intensity.
5:00 a.m. PDT (12:00 UTC) – Tropical Depression Thirteen-E forms 575 mi (925 km) south-southwest of Cabo San Lucas, Mexico.
11:00 a.m. PDT (18:00 UTC) – Tropical Storm Lida weakens to a tropical depression.
11:00 a.m. PDT (18:00 UTC) – Tropical Depression Thirteen-E strengthens into Tropical Storm Max.
11:00 p.m. PDT (06:00 UTC September 19) – Hurricane Kenneth weakens to a category three hurricane.
11:00 p.m. PDT (06:00 UTC September 19) – Tropical Storm Lidia is absorbed by Tropical Storm Max.

September 19
2:00 a.m. HST (12:00 UTC) – Hurricane Jova reaches category three intensity.
11:00 a.m. PDT (18:00 UTC) – Hurricane Kenneth weakens to category two intensity.
5:00 p.m. PDT (00:00 UTC September 20) – Hurricane Kenneth weakens to category one intensity.
5:00 p.m. PDT (00:00 UTC September 20) – Tropical Storm Max strengthens into Hurricane Max.

September 20
11:00 a.m. PDT (18:00 UTC) – Hurricane Kenneth weakens to a tropical storm.
11:00 p.m. PDT (06:00 UTC September 21) – Hurricane Max weakens to a tropical storm.

September 21
2:00 p.m. HST (00:00 UTC September 22) – Hurricane Jova weakens to a category two hurricane.

September 22
2:00 a.m. HST (12:00 UTC) – Hurricane Jova weakens to a category one hurricane.
5:00 a.m. PDT (12:00 UTC) – Tropical Storm Max weakens to a tropical depression.
11:00 a.m. PDT (18:00 UTC) – Tropical Depression Max degenerates into a remnant low-pressure area.
2:00 p.m. HST (00:00 UTC September 23) – Hurricane Jova weakens to a tropical storm.
5:00 p.m. PDT (00:00 UTC September 23) – Tropical Depression Fourteen-E forms 590 mi (950 km) southwest of Acapulco, Mexico.

September 23
5:00 a.m. PDT (12:00 UTC) – Tropical Depression Fourteen-E strengthens into Tropical Storm Norma.
2:00 p.m. HST (00:00 UTC September 24) – Tropical Storm Jova weakens to a tropical depression.

September 24

5:00 p.m. PDT (00:00 UTC September 25) – Tropical Storm Kenneth re-strengthens into a hurricane.
8:00 p.m. HST (06:00 UTC September 25) – Tropical Depression Jova dissipates.
approximately 8:00 p.m. HST (06:00 UTC September 25) –  Hurricane Kenneth, while a category one storm, crosses the 140°W boundary and moves into the Central Pacific Hurricane Center's area of responsibility.

September 25
2:00 a.m. HST (12:00 UTC) – Hurricane Kenneth weakens to a tropical storm.
11:00 p.m. PDT (06:00 UTC September 26) – The remnants of Max dissipate.

September 26
11:00 a.m. PDT (18:00 UTC) – Tropical Storm Norma weakens to a tropical depression.

September 27
11:00 a.m. PDT (18:00 UTC) – Tropical Depression Norma degenerates into a remnant low-pressure area.
5:00 p.m. PDT (00:00 UTC September 28) – Tropical Depression Fifteen-E forms 140 mi (225 km) south of Manzanillo, Mexico.

September 28
11:00 p.m. PDT (06:00 UTC September 29) – Tropical Depression Fifteen-E strengthens to Tropical Storm Otis.

September 29
2:00 a.m HST (12:00 UTC) – Tropical Storm Kenneth weakens to a tropical depression.
11:00 p.m. PDT (06:00 UTC September 30) – Tropical Storm Otis strengthens into Hurricane Otis.

September 30

8:00 a.m. HST (18:00 UTC) – Tropical Depression Kenneth dissipates.
11:00 p.m. PDT (06:00 UTC October 1) – The remnants of Norma dissipate.
11:00 p.m. PDT (06:00 UTC October 1) – Hurricane Otis reaches category two intensity.

October
October 1
11:00 a.m. PDT (18:00 UTC) – Hurricane Otis weakens to a category one hurricane.

October 2
5:00 a.m. PDT (12:00 UTC) – Hurricane Otis weakens to a tropical storm.

October 3
5:00 a.m. PDT (12:00 UTC) – Tropical Storm Otis weakens to a tropical depression.
5:00 p.m. PDT (00:00 UTC October 4) – Tropical Depression Otis degenerates into a remnant low-pressure area.

October 5
11:00 a.m. PDT (18:00 UTC) – The remnants of Otis dissipate.

October 14
5:00 p.m. PDT (00:00 UTC October 15) – Tropical Depression Sixteen-E forms 415 mi (670 km) south of Acapulco, Mexico.

October 17
5:00 p.m. PDT (00:00 UTC October 18) – Tropical Depression Sixteen-E degenerates into a remnant low-pressure area.

October 19

5:00 a.m. PDT (12:00 UTC) – The remnants of Sixteen-E regenerate into a tropical depression.

October 20
5:00 p.m. PDT (00:00 UTC October 21) – Tropical Depression Sixteen-E again degenerates into a remnant low-pressure area, which is later absorbed into the Intertropical Convergence Zone.

November
November 30
The 2005 Pacific hurricane season officially ends.

See also

 2005 Pacific hurricane season
 Pacific hurricane season
 Timeline of the 2005 Atlantic hurricane season
 Timeline of the 2005 Pacific typhoon season

Notes

References

Pacific hurricane meteorological timelines
Articles which contain graphical timelines